An in memoriam segment is a memorial to the people, of one particular field or industry, who have recently died. Typically, such memorials air on television, mostly during awards ceremonies. These segments consist of images or video clips of the recently departed individuals, edited together into a montage and usually accompanied by music. These memorials have been featured in such places as the Oscars, the Emmys, the Grammys, the Tonys, the Olivier Awards, the SAG Awards, and even the NFL during Super Bowl week.

History
In 1978, the 50th annual ceremony for the Academy Awards (the Oscars) honored the golden anniversary of the award with a special segment featuring Sammy Davis, Jr., singing the Marvin Hamlisch song, “Come Light the Candles,” over a memorial montage. It wasn't until 1994, though, that the In Memoriam segment—paying tribute to the movie stars, film crew members, and Hollywood movie executives who had died in the previous year—became an annual Oscar tribute, beginning with the 66th Academy Awards. Soon after that, the Grammys, the Emmys, and the Screen Actors Guild (SAG) Awards followed suit with their own annual memorial segments. By the 21st century, the in memoriam tribute had become one of the most popular, and most scrutinized, segments at annual awards ceremonies.

One awards show that is known for not featuring an in memoriam segment is the ceremony for the Golden Globe Awards. In lieu of a televised memorial, the Golden Globes choose to honor those who have recently died with a special tribute page on their official website.

Selection process
Typically, for an awards show, the decision on who gets honored during the in memoriam segment lies not with the ceremony's producers, but with a committee assigned to the task of making the final decision. The committee will usually start out with a long list, featuring the names of hundreds of recently deceased individuals; from there, the committee will whittle the list down to a feasible number. Footage of all the honorees must collectively fit into a montage running no more than a few minutes in length. For the Grammys, that means honoring roughly 50 people in a span of about three minutes. For the Oscars, it usually entails fitting 40-45 tributes into a three- to four-minute film. The final montage, usually accompanied by what producer Chuck Workman calls "some schmaltzy music," is typically finished several days in advance of the ceremony in which it is to be shown.

To be included in the Oscars’ In Memoriam segment, one need not have been a member of the Academy of Motion Picture Arts and Sciences (AMPAS). The final decision of whether or not a person is included depends on that person's level and quality of contributions to the movie industry. According to Bruce Davis, executive director of AMPAS from 1990 to 2011, if it is doubtful that a given actor belongs in the Oscars’ memorial tribute, and the actor was better known for work performed on television or Broadway, the committee will typically cut the actor in question from the Oscars’ In Memoriam montage.

Sometimes, a deceased person will be given an individual tribute in lieu of, or at least apart from, inclusion in an in memoriam segment, depending on such factors as the timing of the individual's death or the magnitude of impact the deceased person had on his or her peers in the same field or industry. In 1996, at the 68th Academy Awards, dancer Savion Glover performed a special dance to the song "Singin' in the Rain", in tribute to Gene Kelly, who had died earlier that year. The In Memoriam segment was presented later on in the ceremony.

In 2009, at the 63rd Tony Awards, actress Bebe Neuwirth presented a special tribute to the late Tony-winning actress Natasha Richardson, who died suddenly earlier that year following a skiing accident. Afterward, Neuwirth mentioned the passing of Gerald Schoenfeld, head of Broadway's prestigious Shubert Organization, before introducing the in memoriam segment which paid tribute to the rest of Broadway's stars who had died in the previous year's time.

In 2012, singer Whitney Houston died just 36 hours before the 54th Annual Grammy Awards were to take place. In response, Grammy producers decided to make major last-minute changes to the ceremony in order to allow the show's performers and presenters to pay tribute to Houston throughout the show.

In 2017, just one day prior to the 89th Academy Awards ceremony, movie actor Bill Paxton died. Even though he was not officially included in the Oscar's In Memoriam segment the next day, actress Jennifer Aniston, during her presentation of that memorial montage, tearfully paid verbal tribute to Paxton before the montage played.

Controversies
During the awards season, those working in the public relations industry might lobby for a deceased person's inclusion in a particular award show's in memoriam segment. If a certain person is excluded from the montage, it is bound to generate heated discussion afterwards. On many occasions, there has been glaring controversy over the exclusion, or inclusion, of certain people with respect to an in memoriam segment. Sometimes, the controversy focuses on the way the montage was presented.

Examples
In 2011, during the 83rd Academy Awards, the In Memoriam segment neglected to include actor Corey Haim, who died March 11, 2010, at the age of 38. Afterward, Haim's frequent movie co-star, Corey Feldman, did multiple interviews expressing his dismay over Haim's exclusion. As of March 2018, Feldman has remained angry at the Oscars, saying that it was a "travesty and a tragedy" that his fellow Corey was not part of their In Memoriam tribute.

In 2014, CBS decided that during its telecast of the 68th Tony Awards, it would not play the annual in memoriam segment on television, opting instead to let the memorial montage be shown exclusively to the live audience at Radio City Music Hall during a commercial break. This decision was backed by the ceremony's producers, but was panned by many Broadway insiders.

In 2016, at the 58th Annual Grammy Awards, the late Natalie Cole was featured prominently during the in memoriam segment, appearing on screen for 45 seconds at the end. After the segment played, members of her family complained that the tribute to Cole wasn't big enough.

In 2017, during the 89th Academy Awards, one of the images shown as part of the In Memoriam segment was of Jan Chapman, who was alive at the time of the telecast.

In February 2018, during the week leading up to Super Bowl LII, an in memoriam video, honoring recently deceased people associated with the NFL, was shown at the site of the game, U.S. Bank Stadium; one of the honorees in the montage was Aaron Hernandez, a former professional football player who had killed himself in his prison cell ten months earlier. Hernandez was convicted, in 2014, for the murder of Odin Lloyd, though the conviction was under appeal at the time of Hernandez's death.

In April 2018, the Laurence Olivier Awards came under fire for not including the late Sir Peter Hall, acclaimed British theatre director, in its in memoriam segment. To make up for this omission, the Olivier Awards renamed its Best Director trophy the "Sir Peter Hall Award for Best Director."

In September 2018, viewers of the 70th Primetime Emmy Awards were outraged when this ceremony's in memoriam segment included recently-dead politician John McCain—but not the late rapper/television star Mac Miller.

Response
The producers of in memoriam segments frequently defend their decisions to include some but not others, on the grounds that there is not enough time in an award show to honor every single person who has recently died. As one longtime AMPAS member put it:

Ken Ehrlich, longtime producer of the Grammy Awards, says that "there’s always criticism...we start with a list of 300 worthy people. We can’t do 300 worthy people. At some point, it becomes subjective." Chuck Workman, a past editor of the Oscars' memorial tribute, notes that when deciding how many people get into the montage, the audience's patience must be taken into consideration. "I don't think they want to sit for 10 minutes," says Workman.

In addition to the televised In Memoriam segment, the Oscars also feature on its website a much longer obituary montage with many more names on it.

References

External links
AMPAS members In Memoriam web page
Academy of Television Arts & Sciences members In Memoriam web page
Recording Academy members In Memoriam web page
SAG members In Memoriam web page
Tony Awards Memorial

Academy Awards
Emmy Awards
Grammy Awards
Laurence Olivier Awards
Monuments and memorials
Death customs
Screen Actors Guild Awards
Television terminology
Tony Awards